Kristen Wall (born 2 June 1976) is a Canadian rower. She competed in the women's single sculls event at the 2000 Summer Olympics.

References

External links
 

1976 births
Living people
Canadian female rowers
Olympic rowers of Canada
Rowers at the 2000 Summer Olympics
Rowers from Victoria, British Columbia